HTJ may refer to:

 Hathras Road railway station, in Uttar Pradesh, India
 Horizontal Tabulation With Justification, a C1 control code